Elophila gurgitalis is a moth in the family Crambidae. It was described by Julius Lederer in 1863. It is found in Suriname and Venezuela.

References

Acentropinae
Moths described in 1863
Moths of South America